Antalya Airport  is a major international airport located  northeast of the city center of Antalya, Turkey. It is a major destination during the European summer leisure season due to its location at the country's Mediterranean coast. It handled 18,741,659 passengers in 2016, making it the third-busiest airport in Turkey. The airport has two international terminals and one domestic terminal. Antalya is one of the major airports in southwestern Turkey, the others being Bodrum and Dalaman. Among the top 50 busiest airports in the world by passenger numbers in 2021, Antalya saw the highest growth in passenger numbers at 125.8%. The airport's passenger numbers that year were among very few international airports to reach a level which matched or exceeded a normal operational year in the 2010s decade.

History
The airport was built to accommodate the millions of passengers who come to Turkey's Mediterranean beaches in summer. It consists of two international terminals and one domestic terminal. The construction of International Terminal 1 started in 1996 by Bayindir Holding and it was ready for service on 1 April 1998. International Terminal 2 was opened in 2005 and the domestic terminal was opened in 2010. The airport is operated by Fraport TAV Antalya A.S., a joint-venture between Fraport AG and TAV Airports.

In July 2011, the airport was selected as Best Airport in Europe (10–25-million-passenger category) by Airports Council International (ACI).

In 2003, the airport handled 10 million passengers, representing an increase of 78% since 1998. According to ACI statistics, Antalya Airport ranked 30th in 2005, 2008 and 2009 for international passenger traffic. In 2008, AYT was the world's 30th-busiest airport in international passengers traffic. In 2009, AYT also held its 30th spot in that category among world airports, with 15,210,733 international passengers. By the end of 2010, it rose to the 23rd spot with over 18 million international passengers.

A new airport is due to open west of Antalya, close to Kaş.

Terminals
There are three terminals at the airport, Terminal 1, Terminal 2, and the Domestic Terminal.

Airlines and destinations
The following airlines operate regular scheduled and charter flights at Antalya Airport:

Traffic statistics

Ground transport 
There are 2 city buses that serve Antalya Airport (number 600 and 400). Route number 600 goes to/from Otogar (city bus station) and route number 400 goes to/from Sarısu. These routes charge a double fare of normal city buses. Also, Havaş shuttles serve the airport to/from 5M Migros shopping centre. This shuttle costs 16tl. The Antalya Tramway has been extended to the airport to provide a railway link to the city.

Antalya Airfield Command 
There is another runway right next to the Antalya airport landing strip. This is a runway or entrance used by the Turkish Air Force and its landing is forbidden to civilians.

References

External links 

 
 
 

1998 establishments in Turkey
Airports established in 1998
Airports in Turkey
Buildings and structures in Antalya
Transport in Antalya
Transport in Antalya Province
Turkish Air Force bases